Victoria October is a fictional character in the Batman comic books, created by writers James Tynion IV and Marguerite Bennett and by penciller and inker Ben Oliver. A transgender bioweapons expert and physician, she first appeared as an ally to Batman in March 2017 in Detective Comics, published by DC Comics. The character has generated positive critical commentary and academic interest.

Publication history
Dr. Victoria October first appeared in Detective Comics #948, cover dated March 2017.

Fictional character biography
Dr. October is a trans woman. By her own assessment, she is the planet's foremost expert in "post-human bioweaponry", and has performed surgery on several bioengineered beings throughout her career. She and Batman knew each other for many years, even before October transitioned from male to female. Before transitioning, she suffered from severe depression and crippling self-doubt and had a "prickly" (her word) personality. She believed transitioning would solve her problems. Although her new gender did not solve these issues, Dr. October gained emotional and moral strength from the knowledge that she finally knew who she was as a person and could no longer blame her gender misalignment on them. Shortly after its completion, Batman provides her with access to the Belfry, his high-technology headquarters atop Old Wayne Tower in downtown Gotham City.

A.R.G.U.S. and Monstertown
In the 2016 Batman story arc "Night of the Monster Men", the villainous Professor Hugo Strange uses a serum to transform living and dead human beings into horrific monsters. Four of them merge into a composite monster at the end of the story, but it is defeated by Batman, Nightwing, Batwoman, Orphan, Spoiler, and Clayface (Basil Karlo). The government agency A.R.G.U.S. creates a quarantine zone encompassing the neighborhood where the creature died, nicknaming it "Monstertown".

As a consultant for A.R.G.U.S., Dr. October is in charge of Monstertown, ensuring that no one harvests the bodies to obtain the serum and that animals (such as rats or seagulls) which eat the bodies and become monstrous are contained. Clayface patrols the sewers beneath Monstertown, retrieving for Dr. October monsters created by leaking serum. She then dissects and studies them.

Curing Clayface
Dr. October makes her second appearance in Detective Comics #959 during the "Gotham Knights/Batman Eternal" story arc. At the Belfry, she performs surgery on the bioengineered "dwarfling", Nomoz, after he is injured battling the villain Ascalon. At that time, she offers to work on a means of returning Clayface to human form permanently. She asks Clayface to stay in his monstrous form for as long as possible so she can chart the mental degradation he undergoes the longer he remains nonhuman. She also acts as his counselor when he despairs of a cure. Batman has Clayface wear a high-technology forearm device (later replaced with a smaller, longer-lasting wristband) that enables him to regain human form without using his powers—reducing the psychotic effect being Clayface has on Karlo. The device is not a cure, as the Clayface DNA consumes Basil Karlo's human DNA whenever he is locked into human form. Dr. October gives him a "placebo" bracelet with messages from his close friend Cassandra Cain (Orphan), which helps him focus on retaining his sanity. After pushing past the twelve-hour mark, Clayface loses his sanity and attacks Dr. October. Orphan intervenes, saving her life by putting the real bracelet back on.

Victoria cares deeply for Karlo, and later calls him a "great friend".

Dr. October expresses a desire to test her cure serum on a less serious case, and Karlo told her of Glory Griffin (the villain Mudface), who was doused in the same chemicals that made Clayface what he is. Karlo also tells Glory Griffin about the potential cure, although she refuses to forgive him for what he did to her. Later, with the cure close to being finished, Clayface is captured by Glory when the villain First Victim takes over Arkham Asylum and releases her. Glory removes Clayface's wrist controller, and he goes insane.

As Clayface races to confront Batman at the Belfry, Col. Jacob Kane gives Batwoman a weapon whose ammunition will destabilize Clayface's molecular structure, killing Karlo. Clayface arrives at Old Wayne Tower, doing significant damage to it. When confronted by Cassandra Cain, Clayface shows empathy and momentarily returns to human form. The Belfry's mudroom collapses, however, dousing him with hundreds of gallons psychoactive mud and driving him insane once more. Batman sends Red Robin and Orphan to Monstertown to alert Dr. October to get Karlo's cure ready. She warns the heroes that although the cure will shock Clayface's system and turn him back into Basil Karlo, the effect will only be temporarily due to the massive amounts of psychoactive mud now in his system.

Orphan manages to inject the cure into Clayface. Her love for him helps Karlo maintain his human form only momentarily. As he assumes his Clayface form, Batwoman shoots him in the head. Dr. October rushes to the site of Karlo's death, and confirms that the psychoactive clay is now inactive and Basil Karlo is dead. Three days later, Dr. October cures Glory Griffin. She accuses Glory of "taking a repentant man on the brink of salvation and throwing him back into hell", and says she gave Glory the cure for the sake of Basil Karlo.

Clayface did not die, however. Seven issues later, in Detective Comics #981, readers discover that Basil Karlo is still alive and retains his Clayface powers (at least to some degree). For reasons unstated, Dr. October conspired with him to fake his death. Karlo watches as Cassandra Cain takes up residence at a health clinic in one of Gotham's slums run by Dr. Leslie Thompkins. He leaves a message for her, and then Dr. October drives him out of Gotham City.

DC Bombshells reality: Viktoria October
The DC Comics Bombshells series is an alternate reality featuring DC Comics superheroines and supervillains reimagined as bombshells (and a few male heroes as beefcake). The series takes place during World War II.

Dr. October makes her first appearance in this alternate reality in DC Comics Bombshells #83. In the Bombshells universe, her name is spelled "Viktoria". A Russian citizen, she worked with Ipati Dugan (the Bombshell Universe version of Pat Dugan, the hero known as S.T.R.I.P.E.) on a top-secret cosmonaut program in the years immediately following the Russian Revolution of 1917. Their program was funded by Alexander Luthor. She and Dugan successfully sent Lena Luthor into space. Unfortunately, Lena's ship was lost in time, and Lex Luthor demanded that the Soviet authorities arrest October and Dugan. Dugan was seized and sent into exile, but October escaped. Dr. October somehow continued to find work as an agent of the Soviet government, and became a pioneer in the work of biomechanics and the ethics of bioweaponry. She attended a secret Solvay Conference in 1938 in which Dr. Hugo Strange proposed a worldwide program of eugenics to Dr. October's horror. Just before the war broke out, she attended a "Conference on the Ethics of Bioweaponry" in Paris, France, where her presentation was witnessed by Pamela Isley (the Bombshell Universe version of the villain Poison Ivy).

In her first appearance in DC Comics Bombshells, Dr. October is living in Leningrad, which was then undergoing the Siege of Leningrad. She meets Harley Quinn and other heroes when Raven magically transports Harley's circus into the city. Dr. October knows that Hugo Strange is now an agent of the Soviet government, and is working on various schemes to help lift the siege. She has been on the alert to any change in the laws of physics which would imply the use of magic, which is what drew her to the Harley group's arrival. Dr. October shows Isley how starvation has affected Leningrad, and Isley uses her powers to create a garden to feed the people of the city.

Dr. October alerts Lois Lane and the others in Harley's group to Hugo Strange's experiments on political prisoners, particularly one bioweapon (the Bombshell Universe version of Power Girl) that appears at night to attack the Nazi army. She gives Lois and Andrea Grüener (the Bombshell Universe's female version of Dr. Benjamin Gruener—the villain known as The Reaper) a device to find this bioweapon.

After Supergirl (named Kara Starikov in this reality) liberates Power Girl from Hugo Strange's control, Dr. October helps Supergirl learn more about herself by describing the horrors the people of Leningrad have gone through. In turn, Supergirl reveals that she has been given a kryptonite knife. Dr. October declines to accept the knife, and instead leaves the group off to do more "humane mad sciencing". When the Kryptonian refugee Faora kills Raven's father, Trigon, Raven goes mad. Faora steals some of Raven's blood, transforming herself into the Bombshell version of Doomsday. Riding a firebird, Dr. October retrieves Varvara Dugina (Supergirl's adoptive mother) from the American refugee center where she's been hiding, Ipati Dugan (Supergirl's adoptive father) from the Soviet gulag where he was imprisoned, and Samuel Whitmore (biological father of Bombshell Universe's Stargirl) from his home in London. Ipati (transported by a zmei) and Varvara and Samuel (each riding a gamayun) arrive at the scene of battle. Dr. October orders the lesovik, Swamp Thing, to consume Doomsday. Supergirl and the Beefcake Superman destroy the kryptonite knife with their heat-vision, and Zatanna, John Constantine, and Raven to imbue the lesovik, Swamp Thing, with its radioactivity. To make the magic work, Varvara, Ipati, and Whitmore give up their lives, thus imprisoning Doomsday forever inside Swamp Thing.

Dr. October has a cameo in DC Comics Bombshells #100, appearing in Pamela Isley's garden as the Siege of Leningrad is lifted.

Description
Dr. October appears as a young woman with a white forelock streak in her black hair. Clayface calls it her Bride of Frankenstein look. When working, she usually wears a white lab coat. She prefers black dresses that end above the knee and high-heeled black ankle boots, has a preference for phở, and sometimes wears gloves and uses a cane.

In the Bombshells Universe, Dr. October continues to wear the same black dress. Instead of a lab coat, she is clad in a knee-length, double-breasted, heavy white winter coat with a wide fur collar. Her ensemble also includes a white boyar hat, knee-high black boots, gloves, and a cane.

Cultural importance
Some readers, Screengeek.net said, felt Dr. October's transgender status should have been more prominently mentioned and Batman's acceptance made more vocal. But Kelsey Loiselle, reviewing Dr. October's early appearances in Detective Comics, argued that writers James Tynion IV and Marguerite Bennett worked hard to ensure that Dr. October's appearances did not "us[e] transgender conversation to bolster...sales" but rather used them to discuss the meaning of identity and what it means for superheroes and readers.

Reviewer Andrew Dyce called Dr. October's introduction one of "beauty, elegance, and dignity", rather than a "reveal" meant to grab headlines and get attention. He praised Dr. October's first two appearances, arguing "it isn't Detective Comics''' goal to simply acknowledge transgender individuals' existence. It's to help every reader understand what gender identity can mean to those outside of the crowd—and just as importantly, what it might not". He was particularly impressed with the "power of pronouns" dialogue in Detective Comics #959, when Dr. October asks the bioengineered being Nomoz for preferred name, pronoun, and species identification. Dyce also pointed to October's conversation with Basil Karlo about whether a cure will get rid of his violence, lack of control, and guilt. The discussion reflects Dr. October's own gender transition, yet shows that this has meaning for non-transgender individuals (and the reader).

Reporter Marissa Higgins, writing for web site The Daily Dot, noted "how important it is for people to have representation that feels real". Dialogue in Detective Comics makes Dr. October a "real" transgender person by addressing issues fundamental to transgender people: Choosing a new name, deadnaming, and revealing that one is transgender. Higgins applauded how the comic provided these details as character history and avoided making transgender identity "the all-consuming present and future" of Dr. October.

The manner in which Batman affirms his respect for Dr. October and her gender transition has also drawn positive attention. Andrew Dyce observed that Batman sends Dr. October a card after her gender reassignment—as Batman'', not as Bruce Wayne. This puts the imprimatur of the widely loved superhero on gender reassignment. As the "model of ideal masculinity", author Jeffrey A. Brown writes, Batman's action enables readers (especially men) to see gender transition as appropriate behavior and transgender individuals as "perfectly normal" and worthy of respect.

References
Notes

Citations

External links
 
 

Batman characters
Comics characters introduced in 2017
Fictional physicists
Fictional engineers
Fictional female engineers
Fictional biologists
Fictional chemists
Fictional American physicians
DC Comics female characters
DC Comics LGBT characters
DC Comics scientists
Fictional transgender women